The 1897 Colgate football team represented Colgate University in the 1897 college football season. The team captain for the 1897 season was Walter Cramp.

Schedule

References

Colgate
Colgate Raiders football seasons
Colgate football